Humans have approximately 500–600 lymph nodes distributed throughout the body, with clusters found in the underarms, groin, neck, chest, and abdomen.

Lymph nodes of the head

 Occipital lymph nodes
 Mastoid lymph nodes
 Parotid lymph nodes

Lymph nodes of the neck

 Cervical lymph nodes
 Submental lymph nodes
 Submandibular lymph nodes
 Deep cervical lymph nodes
 Deep anterior cervical lymph nodes
 Deep lateral cervical lymph nodes
Inferior deep cervical lymph nodes
 Jugulo-omohyoid lymph node
 Jugulodigastric lymph node
 Supraclavicular lymph nodes
 Virchow's node

Lymph nodes of the thorax

 Lymph nodes of the lungs: The lymph is drained from the lung tissue through subsegmental, segmental, lobar and interlobar lymph nodes to the hilar lymph nodes, which are located around the hilum (the pedicle, which attaches the lung to the mediastinal structures, containing the pulmonary artery, the pulmonary veins, the main bronchus for each side, some vegetative nerves and the lymphatics) of each lung. The lymph flows subsequently to the mediastinal lymph nodes.
 Mediastinal lymph nodes: They consist of several lymph node groups, especially along the trachea (5 groups), along the esophagus and between the lung and the diaphragm. In the mediastinal lymph nodes arises lymphatic ducts, which drains the lymph to the left subclavian vein (to the venous angle in the confluence of the subclavian and deep jugular veins).
The mediastinal lymph nodes along the esophagus are in tight connection with the abdominal lymph nodes along the esophagus and the stomach. That fact facilitates spreading of tumor cells through these lymphatics in cases of cancers of the stomach and particularly of the esophagus.
Through the mediastinum, the main lymphatic drainage from the abdominal organs goes via the thoracic duct (ductus thoracicus), which drains majority of the lymph from the abdomen to the above mentioned left venous angle.

Lymph nodes of the abdomen
These include:
Periaortic lymph nodes
Preaortic lymph nodes
Celiac lymph nodes
Hepatic lymph nodes
Gastric lymph nodes
Splenic lymph nodes
Superior mesenteric lymph nodes
Inferior mesenteric lymph nodes
Retroaortic lymph nodes

Nodes around the iliac vessels are:
Common iliac lymph nodes
Internal iliac lymph nodes
External iliac lymph nodes

Others in the pelvis include:
Sacral lymph nodes
Retroperitoneal lymph nodes

Lymph nodes of the arm

These drain the whole of the arm, and are divided into two groups, superficial and deep. The superficial nodes are supplied by lymphatics that are present throughout the arm, but are particularly rich on the palm and flexor aspects of the digits.
 Superficial lymph nodes of the arm:
 Supratrochlear nodes: Situated above the medial epicondyle of the humerus, medial to the basilic vein, they drain the C7 and C8 dermatomes.
 Deltoideopectoral nodes: Situated between the pectoralis major and deltoid muscles inferior to the clavicle.
 Deep lymph nodes of the arm: These comprise the axillary nodes, which are 20-30 individual nodes and can be subdivided into:
 Lateral nodes
 Anterior or pectoral nodes
 Posterior or subscapular nodes
 Central or intermediate nodes
 Medial or subclavicular nodes

Lower limbs

 Superficial inguinal lymph nodes
 Deep inguinal lymph nodes
 Popliteal lymph nodes

Distribution 
The lymphatic vessels that link the lymph nodes are:

 The lymphatics of the head, face, neck, and meningeal lymphatic vessels – drain to the deep cervical lymph nodes
 The jugular trunk
 The subclavian lymph trunk
 The thoracic duct
 The lymphatics of the upper extremity
 The right and left bronchomediastinal lymph trunks
 The lymphatics of the lower extremity
 The lymphatics of the abdomen and pelvis
 The lymphatic vessels of the thorax

Vessels
Lists of human anatomical features